St Michel–Auber93 WE is a French women's road cycling team that was founded in 2012, before registering with the UCI for the 2022 season.

Major results
2012
Wanze, Roxane Fournier
Stage 3 Tour de Bretagne, Roxane Fournier

2013
Stage 4 Tour de Bretagne, Roxane Fournier

World, continental & national champions
2015
 European Cyclocross (Masters 30–34), Alna Burato
 European Cyclocross (Masters 40–44), Karine Temporelli

2016
 European Cyclocross (Masters 30–34), Alna Burato
 European Cyclocross (Masters 40–44), Karine Temporelli
 World Cyclocross (Masters 30–34), Alna Burato
 World Cyclocross (Masters 40–44), Karine Temporelli

2019
 France Junior Track (Individual pursuit), Kristina Nenadovic

2021
 France Track (Individual pursuit), Kristina Nenadovic

References

Cycling teams based in France
Cycling teams established in 2012